XONE (formerly X360) was a monthly magazine produced by Imagine Publishing in the United Kingdom. XONE was the UK's #1 selling independent dedicated Xbox 360 and Xbox One magazine, covering news, previews and reviews. The magazine's community and Xbox Live was also featured heavily in the magazine.

History and profile
The magazine was originally included as a supplement in the now-defunct Highbury Entertainment publication XBM, but was made a monthly magazine in October 2005, prior to the launch of the Xbox 360. It was Highbury Entertainment's biggest ever launch (known at the time as X-360), with over £200k spent on below-the-line marketing.
The magazine is packaged with a DVD featuring game trailers narrated by the XONE team, plus a book usually containing a walkthrough or achievement guide. In October 2013 its original title, X360, was changed to X-ONE with the issue 104.

The magazine ceased publication as of November 2015.

Format

Network
The magazine's introductory section covering recent news, developer insights, and monthly opinion columns.

Previews
The preview section contained information, screenshots and developer interviews about future titles. It also contains information similar to that present in the 'review' section.

Reviews
The latest games were reviewed here. A section at the beginning of each review gave information such as the game's publisher, genre, developer, release date and other details. XONE scores games on a 1-10 scale.

Community
Xbox Live and Arcade reviews, along with downloadable add-on ratings and the letters section.

References

External links
Official Website
Official Forum
Imagine Publishing Website

2005 establishments in the United Kingdom
2015 disestablishments in the United Kingdom
Monthly magazines published in the United Kingdom
Video game magazines published in the United Kingdom
Defunct magazines published in the United Kingdom
Magazines established in 2005
Magazines disestablished in 2015
Xbox magazines
Xbox 360
Xbox One